Potassium nitride is an unstable chemical compound. Several syntheses were erroneously claimed in the 19th century, and by 1894 it was assumed that it did not exist.

However, a synthesis of this compound was claimed in 2004. It is observed to have the anti- structure below , although a -type structure should be more stable. Above this temperature, it converts to an orthorhombic phase. This compound was produced by the reaction of potassium metal and liquid nitrogen at  under vacuum:
6K + N2 → 2K3N
This compound decomposes back into potassium and nitrogen at room temperature.

This compound is unstable due to steric hindrance.

References 

Potassium compounds
Nitrides